Ofelia Giudicissi Curci (1934–1981) was an Italian poet, and archeologist.

Life
Ofelia was born in the Arbëreshë populated Pallagorio, a settlement near Crotone, in Calabria, southern Italy on 11 May 1934. She published her first poetry in a volume called Pallagorio (published by Arti Grafiche Pedanesi, Rome) in 1964. Fifteen years after she died (13 September 1981), her husband and sons published a collection of her poetry together with a photo album. In October 1996, Momenti di un profilo meridionale ("Moments of a southern profile") was published post-mortum in Florence by publishing house "Parretti Grafiche".
She worked also in the field of archaeology, mostly on the terrain of her native area, and performed a research on the etymology of her town Pallagorio.

References

1934 births
1981 deaths
People from the Province of Crotone
Italian people of Arbëreshë descent
Italian archaeologists
20th-century Italian poets
20th-century Italian women writers
Italian women archaeologists
20th-century archaeologists